RC Rustavi Kharebi is a Georgian semi-professional rugby club from Rustavi, who plays in the Didi 10, the first division of Georgian rugby.

Current squad
2019/20

External links
Rustavi Kharebi

Rugby union teams from Georgia (country)
Rustavi